Joseph Myles McDonnell (died 1872) was an Irish Repeal Association politician.

References

External links
 

UK MPs 1841–1847
Members of the Parliament of the United Kingdom for County Mayo constituencies (1801–1922)
Irish Repeal Association MPs
1872 deaths